Alfred Griffin (or Griffith) Hatfield (November 7, 1848 or 1850 – April 3, 1921) was a performer and minstrel show producer as Al G. Field and sometimes Al G. Fields.

Biography
He was born in Leesburg, Virginia near Morgantown, West Virginia on November 7, 1848 or 1850, as Alfred Griffin Hatfield  or Alfred Griffith Hatfield. He had a brother Joseph E. Hatfield.

Beginning in 1875 he performed with the Sells Brothers Circus that was based out of Columbus, Ohio. In 1884 he organized the Hagenbeck-Wallace Circus in Peru, Indiana. He managed them until September 9, 1886. He launched his own namesake minstrel show the same year. His autobiography Watch Yourself Go By was published in 1912. He changed his name and established his own company in 1886. He eventually retreated to a farm and bred animals. 

He died on April 3, 1921, in Columbus, Ohio from Bright's Disease. He was buried in Green Lawn Cemetery in Columbus, Ohio. His last will and testament arranged for his minstrel show to be bequeathed to his brother, Joseph E. Hatfield, and to Edward Conard, a relative. His estate was valued at $150,000 and he requested that the minstrel show continue to be operated.

Many printed advertisements for his shows remain in existence, including at the Library of Congress. Some include his image.

Performers
Bert Swor (1871-1931) from 1911 to 1931.
Billy Church (?-1942).

Shows
Darkest America, first staged in 1896

References

External links

1848 births
1921 deaths
Deaths from kidney failure
Blackface minstrel managers and producers
Burials at Green Lawn Cemetery (Columbus, Ohio)
People from Leesburg, Virginia